The Treason Act 1429 (8 Hen.6 c.6) was an Act of the Parliament of England. It made it high treason for a person to threaten to burn someone's house down if they did not leave money in a certain place, and then carry out the threat. It also made it a felony to send a letter demanding money.

This category of treason was abolished by the Treason Act 1547. This Act was repealed for England (including Wales) by the Statute Law Revision Act 1863 (26 & 27 Vict c 125) and for Ireland by the Statute Law (Ireland) Revision Act 1872 (35 & 36 Vict c 98).

See also
High treason in the United Kingdom

References

Treason in England
Acts of the Parliament of England
1420s in law
1429 in England